Epitolina melissa, the powdered epitolina, is a butterfly in the family Lycaenidae. The species was first described by Hamilton Herbert Druce in 1888. It is found in Guinea, Sierra Leone, Liberia, Ivory Coast, Ghana, Togo, Nigeria (south and the Cross River loop), Cameroon, Equatorial Guinea, Gabon, the Republic of the Congo, the Central African Republic, Angola, the Democratic Republic of the Congo (Shaba to Kafakumba and Kapanga), Uganda and north-western Tanzania. Its habitat consists of forests.

References

Butterflies described in 1888
Poritiinae
Butterflies of Africa
Taxa named by Hamilton Herbert Druce